A dream character, sometimes abbreviated as DC, is an interactable human-like entity in the person's dream, especially while the person is REM-sleeping. The topic has been profoundly addressed in the lucid dreaming community, since while experiencing a lucid dream, the person can consciously interact with dream characters.

Agreeability
Dream characters may agree or disagree if asked to perform specific tasks.

Reappearance
A specific dream character may reappear from dream to dream.

References

Character